The Farman F.200 was a civil utility aircraft produced in France in the 1930s. Derived from the F.190, it featured a revised fuselage that did away with its predecessor's enclosed cabin. Instead, it was a parasol-wing monoplane with open cockpits in tandem for the pilot and one or two passengers. Intended primarily as a trainer, it was also marketed as being suitable as a photographic platform or a mail plane.

Variants

F.200 (1923) An unrelated earlier use of the designation for a small two-seat touring aircraft.
F.200version with  Salmson 9Ac engine.
F.201version with  Hispano-Suiza 6Pa engine.
F.202version with  Salmson 9Ac engine.
F.203version with  Lorraine 5Pc engine.
F.204version with  Lorraine 5Pb engine.
F.205version with  Hispano-Suiza 6Pa engine.
F.206similar to F.202, but with an enclosed cabin, powered with a  Salmson 9Ac engine.

Specifications (F.200)

References

Bibliography

External links
 
 aviafrance.com

1920s French civil utility aircraft
F.0200
Parasol-wing aircraft
Single-engined tractor aircraft
Aircraft first flown in 1929